The Corpus Christi Procession Leaving the Church of Santa Maria del Mar is an oil painting by Ramon Casas painted in 1898 in Barcelona and currently in the Museu Nacional d'Art de Catalunya in Barcelona.

In 1896, an attack was carried out against the Corpus Christi procession, which had left the Church of Santa Maria del Mar of Barcelona, killing twelve people and creating panic in the city.

Casas chooses to paint the time of departure of the procession from the church, before passing on the Canvis Nous street, where the attack took place.

Style
As in his work El garrot vil, the scene is framed from a perspective of height and the painter delights in the play of colors and festive banners, apricots hung from balconies and the veils of girls dressed in their first Communion gowns accompanying the procession, alluding elliptically shaped into chaos and despair that will occur soon after and what their characters are outsiders. The technique, very loose, rapid brushwork and lightly loaded material, is typical of small format paintings, but it is much more difficult to implement in a painting of this size. Casas applies, once again, with great daring, the resources of modern painting in a genre that seemed forbidden.

References
 Doñate, Mercè; Mendoza, Cristina: Ramon Casas. El pintor del modernisme. MNAC. 2001. 
 The Corpus Christi Procession Leaving the Church of Santa Maria 

Paintings in the collection of the Museu Nacional d'Art de Catalunya
1898 paintings
Horses in art
Paintings by Ramón Casas